Galini may refer to:

 Galini, Cyprus,  deserted village in Cyprus
 Galini, village in Schinokapsala community, Lasithi, Crete, Greece
 Agia Galini, village in Rethymno regional unit, Crete, Greece